Filippo Giannini  (9 May 1923 – 10 February 2012) was an Italian prelate of the Catholic Church.

Biography 
Giannini was born in Nettuno, Italy, and ordained a priest on 15 June 1946. He was named appointed auxiliary bishop to the Diocese of Rome on 1 December 1980, as well as Titular Bishop of Subaugusta and ordained bishop on 6 January 1981. Giannini retired as an auxiliary bishop of Rome on 3 July 1998, and died in 2012, aged 88.

See also
Diocese of Rome

External links
Catholic-Hierarchy
Rome Diocese (Italian)

20th-century Italian titular bishops
Bishops in Lazio
1923 births
2012 deaths
Place of death missing